Michele Brix Nielsen (born 10 July 1996) is a Danish ice hockey player and member of the Danish national ice hockey team, currently serving as captain of the Odense IK Kvinder in the KvindeLigaen.

Playing career
She has represented Denmark at eight IIHF Women's World Championships, including at the Top Division tournament of the 2021 IIHF Women's World Championship. 

Career statistics

International

References

External links 
 

Living people
1996 births
Brynäs IF Dam players
Danish expatriate ice hockey people
Danish expatriate sportspeople in Sweden
Danish women's ice hockey forwards
European Women's Hockey League players
Expatriate ice hockey players in Sweden
Ice hockey players at the 2022 Winter Olympics
Olympic ice hockey players of Denmark
Sportspeople from Odense